Copestylum macrocephalum is a species of syrphid fly in the family Syrphidae.This species has been observed in Mexico (Baja), California,and Arizona.

References

Eristalinae
Diptera of North America
Hoverflies of North America
Articles created by Qbugbot
Insects described in 1892